Scorzonera humilis, the viper's-grass, is a perennial plant. In Britain it is a rare plant, restricted to moist meadows, in Dorset and Warwick in England, and in South Wales.

One unique class of stilbenoid derivative was first isolated from S. humilis. They were named the tyrolobibenzyls after Tyrol in the eastern Alps, where the plant was collected.

Description 
It differs from goat's-beard,  Tragopogon pratensis, in that it has short, pale green bracts, whereas in Goats Beard they are long and pointed.

It grows 7 to 50 cm.

The leaves are unbranched, elliptical-lanceolate.

The flower heads are 2.5 cm wide, and deep yellow in colour.  Flowers from May until July.

The achenes are smooth ribbed, beakless, with similar pappus to Tragopogon pratensis.

It exudes a milky juice from its stem.

References

Cichorieae
Plants described in 1753
Taxa named by Carl Linnaeus